The 2001 Campeonato Mineiro de Futebol do Módulo I was the 87th season of Minas Gerais's top-flight professional football league. The season began on January 27 and ended on June 3. América won the championship, winning the title for the 15th time.

Participating teams

System 
The championship would have three stages.:

 First phase: The twelve teams all played in a single round-robin tournament, with the eight best teams qualifying to the Second phase and the two worst teams being relegated.
 Second phase: The eight remaining teams were divided into two groups of four; the teams played the teams of their own group in a double round-robin tournament, with the best team in each group advancing to the Finals.
 Finals: The group winners of the Second phase played in a two-legged tie to define the Champions.

League table

First phase

Second phase

Group A

Group B

Copa Sul-Minas qualfiication table

Finals

First leg

Second leg

References 

Campeonato Mineiro seasons
Mineiro